ICHIJO Homes is an construction company based in Sydney, Australia that specializes in modular energy efficient housing. The company is an affiliate of ICHIJO.,LTD. in Japan.

History 
ICHIJO Homes was first founded in Japan in 1978, expanding its operation and establishing ICHIJO Homes in 2010 in St Leonard, NSW. In May 2011 the company had moved its office due to increasing capacity to the current location in Kings Park, NSW.

Display homes 
Their first display home in Australia was built in Homeworld, Kellyville in September 2011. In September 2012, two new display homes were opened to public in Homeworld, Gledswood Hills. In August 2013, three more display homes were opened to public in Kellyville.

References

Sources 
  ICHIJO website

Home builders
Construction and civil engineering companies of Australia
Companies based in Sydney
Construction and civil engineering companies established in 2010
Australian companies established in 2010